AlkB homolog 3, alpha-ketoglutaratedependent dioxygenase is a protein that in humans is encoded by the ALKBH3 gene.

Function

The Escherichia coli AlkB protein protects against the cytotoxicity of methylating agents by repair of the specific DNA lesions generated in single-stranded DNA. ALKBH2 (MIM 610602) and ALKBH3 are E. coli AlkB homologs that catalyze the removal of 1-methyladenine and 3-methylcytosine (Duncan et al., 2002 [PubMed 12486230]).

References

Further reading